Stephanie London Krogius (born August 18, 1969) is an American former professional tennis player. She played collegiate tennis for the University of Southern California and was a three-time All-American.

London, a junior doubles finalist at the 1984 US Open, made her debut in the women's doubles main draw the following year, partnering Niurka Sodupe. While competing on the professional tour she reached a career high singles ranking of 239 in the world.

In the late 1990s she served as the women's tennis head coach at the University of Arizona.

ITF finals

Singles: 1 (1–0)

Doubles: 1 (0–1)

References

External links
 
 

1969 births
Living people
American female tennis players
USC Trojans women's tennis players
Arizona Wildcats women's tennis coaches
American tennis coaches